is a Japanese professional wrestler, shoot boxer, kickboxer and mixed martial artist, better known simply as . Syuri formerly competed in Ultimate Fighting Championship. Syuri is currently working for World Wonder Ring Stardom, where she is a former  World of Stardom Champion.  She is a former SWA World Champion and formerly was one-half of the Goddesses of Stardom Champions with Giulia.

Originally trained by Tajiri, she started her professional wrestling career in the Hustle promotion, where she worked under the ring name KG (Karate Girl). She later also worked for Hustle's two follow-up promotions; Smash, where she was the final Smash Diva Champion and Wrestling New Classic (WNC), where she was a two-time WNC Women's Champion. After WNC folded in June 2014, she remained affiliated with its sister promotion Reina Joshi Puroresu until March 2016, becoming a one-time Reina World Women's Champion and a one-time Reina World Tag Team Champion. Through Reina's relationship with Consejo Mundial de Lucha Libre (CMLL), Syuri has also worked in Mexico, where she is a former CMLL World Women's Champion and CMLL-Reina International Champion.

Coming from a karate background, Kondo made her shoot boxing debut in 2009 and afterward affiliated herself with the Krush promotion as a kickboxer. Over the next six years, she amassed a record of 13 wins and one loss, while also becoming the inaugural Krush Women's Flyweight Champion in March 2014. In April 2016, Kondo transitioned to mixed martial arts by joining Pancrase. She is the former Strawweight Queen of Pancrase, becoming the inaugural champion in May 2017. In September 2017, she made her Ultimate Fighting Championship (UFC) debut.

Early life
Kondo was born to a Filipino mother and a Japanese father in Ebina, Kanagawa. She started practicing karate in primary school, winning numerous titles, and also excelled in track and field sports in junior high school and tennis in high school. After graduation, she worked as a model for fashion magazines and as a movie extra, before passing an audition held by professional wrestling promotion Hustle.

Professional wrestling career

Hustle (2008–2009)
On October 26, 2008, Kondo made her professional wrestling debut for Hustle in a match, where she, working under the ring name KG (short for Karate Girl), teamed with HG & RG to defeat Big C, Onigumo & Piranha Monster. KG quickly joined Tajiri's Hustle Union Army stable, forming a tag team with stablemate Banzai Chie, and started an intergender rivalry with Rey Ohara. Kondo remained with the promotion until it ceased its operations in late 2009.

Smash (2010–2012)
In December 2009, former Hustle performers Akira Shoji and Tajiri held a press conference announcing the formation of a new promotion, Smash. In addition to the two, former storyline rivals Kondo and Hajime Ohara were also present at the press conference and were named as part of the new promotion's roster. While in Hustle, Kondo had wrestled almost exclusively against male wrestlers as a novelty due to the lack of other female wrestlers in the promotion, in Smash she was poised to become a more serious Joshi wrestler. Kondo, now working under the ring name Syuri, made her Smash debut on March 26, 2010, at the promotion's first-ever event, losing to Meiko Satomura. On April 23 at Smash.2, she teamed with Hajime Ohara in another loss to the team of Lin Byron & Kushida, dropping the pinfall to Byron. On May 29 at Smash.3, Syuri suffered her third straight loss in the promotion, when she, Akira Shoji, and Yusuke Kodama were defeated by Kim Nan Pun, Lin Byron & Mentallo in a Six-Person Tag Team Match. After the match, Syuri had a heated confrontation, leading to a backstage brawl, with Kana, who was sitting in the audience, having earlier announced her arrival to Smash. This led to the main event of Smash.4 on June 25, where Syuri defeated Kana in a fourteen-minute-long match, ending her losing streak and picking up the biggest win of her career. However, Kana came back at Smash.5 on July 24, defeating Syuri via submission in a rematch in just three minutes.

For the next several events, Syuri wrestled against female workers from other independent promotions, who were looking for regular spots on the Smash roster. On September 24 at Smash.8, Syuri was defeated in a Hardcore Match by freelancer Kaoru, after which Kana entered the ring, pushed Kaoru away, and helped Syuri backstage. On November 22 at Smash.10, Syuri & Kana teamed together to defeat Ice Ribbon's Emi Sakura & JWP's Kaori Yoneyama in a Tag Team Match. As a result, Syuri was granted a shot at Yoneyama's JWP Openweight Championship on December 24 in the main event of Happening Eve but was unsuccessful in her attempt to win her first title. On January 29, 2011, at Smash.12, Syuri lost to the debuting former WWE wrestler Serena. Syuri's streak of big matches and her growing popularity among fans eventually led to fellow Smash Seikigun member Lin Byron growing jealous of her, turning heel, and leaving the group to start a rivalry with her. This was followed by Byron picking up back-to-back tag team victories over Syuri at Smash.13 and Live in Osaka, leading to a singles match on February 25 at Smash.14, where Syuri was victorious. At Smash.15, Syuri teamed with Tajiri & Sabu to defeat Byron, Gabriel Antonick & Michael Kovac in a Six-Person Intergender Hardcore Match.

On March 21, 2011, Syuri made her debut for Ice Ribbon, losing to Hikaru Shida. The match eventually led to a partnership between the two and, after defeating Chii Tomiya & Makoto on April 16, Syuri & Shida went on to unsuccessfully challenge Emi Sakura & Ray for the International Ribbon Tag Team Championship on May 5. The partnership also carried over to Smash, where Syuri & Shida defeated Io Shirai & Mio Shirai in a Tag Team Match on May 3 at Smash.17. On May 14, Syuri, along with Tajiri & Hajime Ohara, traveled to Mexico to represent Smash at Toryumon Mexico's DragonMania VI event. Syuri teamed with Lluvia & Marcela to defeat La Comandante, Dalys la Caribeña & Mima Shimoda in a Six-Woman Tag Team Match, submitting Dalys for the win. Upon returning to Japan, Syuri avenged her Ice Ribbon loss by defeating Hikaru Shida on June 9 at Smash.18 in the first round of a tournament to determine the inaugural Smash Diva Champion. On August 11 at Smash.20, Syuri was eliminated from the tournament in the semifinals by Kana, who would go on to become the inaugural champion. On October 28 at Smash.22, Syuri failed to earn a shot at the Smash Diva Championship, when she was defeated in a Four-Way Elimination #1 Contender's Match by Tomoka Nakagawa. Also at Smash.22, Lin Byron made her return to Smash, after a four-month break during which she worked under her masked Ray alias, reigniting her rivalry with Syuri. On November 24 at Smash.23, Syuri defeated Byron in a Hardcore Match, after which the two made peace with each other. During the next two events, Syuri extended her winning streak, defeating Aki Shizuku in a Singles Match on December 30 at Smash.24 and pinning Takuya Kito in a Six-Person Tag Team Match on January 19, 2012, at We Are Smash, proceeding to then challenge Smash Diva Champion Kana to a title match, after she had regained the title from Tomoka Nakagawa. On February 10, Smash announced that the promotion would be folding after its March 14 event, after which Syuri would become a free agent. On February 19 at Smash.25, Syuri defeated Kana to win the Smash Diva Championship for the first time, after which the two longtime rivals hugged and made peace with each other. In her final Smash appearance on March 14 at Smash.Final, Syuri teamed with Mentallo in a Tag Team Match, where they were defeated by Kana & Último Dragón. After the match, Syuri officially retired the Smash Diva Championship.

Wrestling New Classic and Reina (2012–2016)
On April 5, 2012, Tajiri announced the follow-up promotion to Smash, Wrestling New Classic (WNC), which would hold its first event on April 26, and named Syuri as part of the promotion's roster. At the promotion's first event, Before the Dawn, Syuri teamed with Makoto in a Tag Team Match, where they were defeated by Kana & Mio Shirai. On May 12, Syuri returned to Mexico to take part in Toryumon Mexico's DragonMania VII event, where she was defeated by Kana. On May 24 at WNC's second event, Starting Over, Syuri teamed with Kana in a Tag Team Match, where they defeated Makoto & Riho. Three days later at Go! Go! West: Hiroshima, Syuri worked the main event for the first time in WNC, when she, Akira & Dave Finlay defeated Kana, Mikey Whipwreck & Tajiri in a Six-Person Tag Team Match. From May 29 to June 24, Syuri took part in Pro Wrestling Wave's 2012 Catch the Wave tournament, where she wrestled in a round-robin block made up of members of the White Tails stable. After a victory over Mio Shirai, a loss against Kana, and draws against Shuu Shibutani and Ayumi Kurihara, Syuri finished at four points and failed to advance to the semifinals of the tournament. Back in WNC, Syuri started portraying a villainous character, first announcing that she was tired of having to wrestle the same opponents all the time, and then after veteran freelancer Ayako Hamada was revealed as her next opponent, by claiming that she had never even heard of her. Syuri also began sympathizing with Akira, who had recently turned on Tajiri, feeling disgruntled by the supposed changes that had taken place since the transition from Smash. The match took place on July 15 and saw Hamada pick up the win. Following the loss, Syuri attacked Kana, who tried to help her backstage, quit the WNC Seikigun, and joined a new villainous stable formed by Akira & StarBuck. The three wrestled their first match as a unit on August 2, defeating Hajime Ohara, Kana & Tajiri in a Six-Person Tag Team main event. The trio continued their winning ways during the following two days by first defeating the trio of Kana, Tajiri & Yusuke Kodama in the main event of an Osaka show, and then the trio of Hanzo, Kana & Seiki in a semi-main event in Hiroshima. On August 30, the trio main evented another WNC event in Korakuen Hall, defeating Kana, Mikey Whipwreck & and Tajiri in a Barbed Wire Board Deathmatch, during which Syuri took a bump onto one of the barbed wire boards. Syuri, Akira & StarBuck were also victorious in a rematch the following day in Osaka. The trio's win streak ended on September 1 in Toyohashi, when Kana, Whipwreck & Tajiri were victorious in the third and final Barbed Wire Board Deathmatch between the two teams. In the main event of the following WNC event on September 17, Syuri was defeated by Kana via submission in a Tag Team Match, where she and Akira faced Kana & Tajiri. Three days later, Syuri was defeated by Tajiri in an Intergender Match at Korakuen Hall.

On September 25, Syuri returned to Pro Wrestling Wave, when she and Shuu Shibutani entered the 2012 Dual Shock Wave tournament, opening their round-robin block with a win over the team of Hikaru Shida & Yumi Ohka. After suffering a defeat against Kurigohan (Ayumi Kurihara & Mika Iida), Syuri & Shibutani defeated 1st Impact (Makoto & Moeka Haruhi) in their final round-robin match to finish at the top of their block, tied with Shida & Ohka, forcing a decision match between the two teams. Syuri & Shibutani ended up winning the decision match but were defeated in the finals of the tournament by the team of Misaki Ohata & Tsukasa Fujimoto. On October 24, Syuri, Akira & StarBuck named their stable "Synapse". Two days later, Syuri entered the WNC Women's Championship tournament, defeating Lin Byron in her first-round match. On November 28, Syuri defeated Jessica Love to advance to the finals of the tournament. On December 27, Syuri defeated Nagisa Nozaki to win the tournament and become the inaugural WNC Women's Champion. Two days later, Syuri announced that she was going to produce her own event, titled Stimulus, on February 8, 2013, at Shinjuku Face. Syuri's first match as the WNC Women's Champion ended in defeat, when she, Akira, and Synapse's newest member, Shinya Ishikawa, were defeated by Makoto, Mitoshichi Shinose & Tajiri in a Six-Person Tag Team main event on January 25, 2013, with Makoto pinning her for the win. Two days later, Syuri avenged the loss by defeating Makoto in a Non-Title Singles Match. On February 8, Syuri & Hikaru Shida were defeated in the main event of Stimulus by the team of Meiko Satomura & Tomoka Nakagawa. On March 31, Syuri lost the WNC Women's Championship to Makoto in her first defense. On April 14, Syuri made an unadvertised debut for World Wonder Ring Stardom, taking part in a Gauntlet Match, where the soon-to-retire Yuzuki Aikawa faced every wrestler in the promotion. Syuri's participation in the match ended in a one-minute time limit draw with Aikawa. On April 25 at WNC's one year anniversary event, Syuri received a rematch for the WNC Women's Championship in a Seven-Way Match, which also included Arisa Nakajima, Command Bolshoi, Kayoko Haruyama, Nikki Storm, and Lin Byron, who pinned Makoto to win the title. On April 29, Syuri returned to World Wonder Ring Stardom to take part in the promotion's big Ryōgoku Cinderella event at Ryōgoku Kokugikan, teaming with Hiroyo Matsumoto & Kaori Yoneyama in a Six-Woman Tag Team Match, where they were defeated by Mika Nagano, Nanae Takahashi & Tsukasa Fujimoto. On May 15, Syuri returned to Pro Wrestling Wave to take part in the 2013 Catch the Wave tournament. She finished her round-robin block on June 19 with a record of three wins, two draws, and one loss, winning her block and advancing to the semifinals. On July 14, Syuri returned to Ice Ribbon for the first time in over two years, losing to Hikaru Shida in a Singles Match. The following day, Syuri was eliminated from the 2013 Catch the Wave tournament in the semifinals by JWP representative Arisa Nakajima. On August 7, Syuri entered a three-woman round-robin tournament to determine the new WNC Women's Champion, defeating Makoto and earning a spot in the finals. In her second round-robin match on August 8, Syuri was defeated by fellow finalist, Serena. In the finals of the tournament two days later, Syuri was again defeated by Serena.

On September 18, Syuri defeated Serena in a rematch to become the first two-time WNC Women's Champion. Two days later, Syuri defeated Zeuxis in a decision match at a Reina Joshi Puroresu event to become the second Reina World Women's Champion. The following day, Syuri made her debut for the Wrestle-1 promotion, defeating Makoto in a singles match. Afterward, Syuri was sidelined with lower back pain but was still attacked at the September 29 WNC event by Yumiko Hotta, who had earlier laid claim to the Reina World Women's Championship. Syuri returned from her injury at a Reina event on October 4, where she, La Vaquerita, and Zeuxis defeated Hotta, Keiko Aono & Yuiga via Disqualification. On October 17, Syuri took part in a big generational 8-on-8 Elimination Match promoted by Sendai Girls' Pro Wrestling, where she, Hikaru Shida, Kagetsu, Manami Katsu, Sareee, Takumi Iroha, Yoshiko & Yuhi defeated Aja Kong, Command Bolshoi, Dump Matsumoto, Dynamite Kansai, Kyoko Inoue, Manami Toyota, Meiko Satomura & Takako Inoue. Syuri was eliminated from the match after wrestling Kyoko Inoue to a ten-minute time-limit draw. On October 31, Syuri defeated Yumiko Hotta for her first successful defense of both the Reina World Women's Championship and the WNC Women's Championship. On November 18, WNC and Reina held a press conference to announce that Syuri had signed a dual contract with the two promotions, making her the first female wrestler to hold such a contract. With Syuri's help, Reina looked to establish a professional wrestling promotion in her mother's native country, the Philippines. On November 29, Syuri made her second successful defense of the WNC Women's Championship against previous champion Lin Byron. On December 22, Syuri won yet another title, when she defeated La Comandante in a decision match to become the new CMLL-Reina International Champion. On January 18, 2014, Syuri made a non-wrestling appearance at the New Japan Pro-Wrestling (NJPW) and Consejo Mundial de Lucha Libre (CMLL) co-produced Fantastica Mania 2014 event in Korakuen Hall, handing a bouquet of flowers to Rey Cometa & Stuka Jr. before their match. On January 25, Syuri successfully defended the WNC Women's Championship, the CMLL-Reina International Championship, and the Reina World Women's Championship against Mia Yim at a WNC-Reina event in Manila, Philippines. On February 16 at Reina's re-launch event, Syuri successfully defended her Triple Crown against Silueta. Syuri then started a storyline rivalry with Aki Shizuku, who was looking to take over her spot as the "ace" of Reina. On February 27, Akira announced that the Synapse stable had decided to disband, emancipating Syuri who had not portrayed a villain for months. On March 9, Syuri successfully defended the Reina World Women's Championship against Kyoko Kimura.

On April 15, Syuri returned to Mexico to work for CMLL. In her first match of the tour, Syuri teamed with Estrellita & Silueta in a Six-Woman Tag Team Match, where they were defeated by La Amapola, Dalys la Caribeña & Tiffany with La Amapola, the number one contender to the CMLL-Reina International Championship, pinning Syuri for the win. In the title match five days later, Syuri lost the CMLL-Reina International Championship to La Amapola. While in Mexico, Syuri trained with Negro Casas, from whom she adopted the Casas family's trademark la magistral as a finishing move, using it to pin La Amapola for the win in a Six-Woman Tag Team Match on April 21. Syuri's Mexican tour concluded the following day. On May 29, Syuri received a rematch for the CMLL-Reina International Championship back in WNC but was again defeated by La Amapola. On June 18, it was announced that WNC would be shutting down following June 26. The promotion's female wrestlers, Syuri included, remained affiliated with Reina Joshi Puroresu. At WNC's final event on June 26, Syuri successfully defended the Reina World Women's Championship against Aki Shizuku. On August 30 at the final CMLL-Reina Fiesta 2014 event, Syuri unsuccessfully challenged Marcela for the CMLL World Women's Championship. On September 30, Syuri made her fifth and final successful defense of the WNC Women's Championship against Makoto, before the title was retired. On October 30, Syuri produced an event named Syuri Matsuri ("Syuri Festival") in Shinjuku Face, which saw her team with Shiro Koshinaka in a main event tag team match, where they were defeated by Kyoko Kimura & Masaaki Mochizuki. On November 20, Syuri entered a tournament to determine the new Reina World Tag Team Champions, alongside the debuting Lin Byron, who had surprisingly nominated herself as Syuri's partner. The team made it to the finals of the tournament but were there defeated by Arisa Nakajima & Kana when Syuri was betrayed by Byron, who had been paid off by Kana.

On December 12, Syuri defeated Marcela to win the CMLL World Women's Championship for the first time. On December 26, Syuri lost the Reina World Women's Championship to Kana. Syuri made her first successful defense of the CMLL World Women's Championship on January 12 against Shuu Shibutani. On January 19, Syuri took part in CMLL and NJPW's Fantastica Mania 2015 event in Korakuen Hall. On February 25, Syuri & Hikaru Shida defeated Arisa Nakajima & Kana to win the Reina World Tag Team Championship. They made their first successful title defense on March 7 against Kana's stablemates Makoto & Rina Yamashita. Syuri then formed her own stable, named Syuri-gun ("Syuri Army"), to continue opposing Kana's Piero-gun ("Clown Army"). On March 25, Syuri made her second successful defense of the CMLL World Women's Championship against Silueta. Three days later, Syuri returned to Mexico, starting another tour with CMLL. During the tour, Syuri went undefeated for her first six matches, before losing to Marcela in a "Lightning Match" (One Fall Match) on April 6. This led to a Two Out of Three Falls rematch on April 10, where Syuri lost the CMLL World Women's Championship to Marcela. The match also marked the end of Syuri's CMLL tour. On June 13, Syuri & Shida lost the Reina World Tag Team Championship to Piero-gun's Makoto & Rina Yamashita. On July 12, Syuri defeated Cat Power to win the Elite Canadian Championship Wrestling (ECCW) Women's Championship. On August 29, Syuri made her American debut, when she took part in a World of Unpredictable Wrestling (WUW) event in Brooklyn, New York, teaming with Karen & Marcela in a Six-Woman Tag Team Match, where they defeated Mari Sakamoto, Miss Mojo & Solo Darling. On October 9, Syuri & Silueta defeated Makoto & Rina Yamashita to win the Reina World Tag Team Championship. Over the next month, Syuri took part in a tournament to determine the new Reina World Women's Champion, making it to the finals, where she was defeated by Tsukasa Fujimoto. Afterward, Syuri left for another tour of CMLL. Syuri continued leading her own stable, now known as Narcissist-gun, until December 26, 2015, when she disbanded it after she and her stablemates Buffalo & Mineo Fujita were defeated in a Six-Person Tag Team Match by Shiri Gamikyō (Hikaru Shida, Jun Kasai & Toru Owashi). On January 31, 2016, Syuri announced she would be leaving Reina following March 25. On February 28, Syuri lost the ECCW Women's Championship back to Cat Power. On March 16, Syuri & Silueta relinquished the Reina World Tag Team Championship due to Syuri's impending departure from the promotion. On March 25, Syuri wrestled her final Reina match, where she and Maki Narumiya defeated Maya Yukihi & Risa Sera.

Freelancing (2016–present)
On September 11, 2016, Syuri won her first title as a freelancer, when she and Hikaru Shida defeated Kaori Yoneyama & Tsubasa Kuragaki for the Oz Academy Tag Team Championship. Syuri & Shida won another title on November 23, when they defeated Dash Chisako & Kaoru for the Sendai Girls World Tag Team Championship. Syuri & Shida lost the Oz Academy Tag Team Championship to Akino & Kaho Kobayashi in their fourth defense on June 25, 2017. On July 15, Syuri & Shida lost the Sendai Girls World Tag Team Championship to Cassandra Miyagi & Dash Chisako also in their fourth defense.

Return to Stardom (2020–present)
On January 19, 2020, at the Stardom 9th Anniversary show, Syuri made her return to Stardom as the newest member of Giulia's & Maika's unit "Donna Del Mondo", where they defeated Tokyo Cyber Squad (Death Yama-san, Hana Kimura & Leyla Hirsch). On February 8, Donna Del Mondo defeated Queen's Quest (AZM, Momo Watanabe & Utami Hayashishita) to win the Artist of Stardom Championship. On March 24, Syuri participated in the Cinderella Tournament and made it to the semi-final, where she lost to the fellow Donna Del Mondo member Giulia. On October 3, after Syuri unsuccessfully challenged Mayu Iwatani for her World of Stardom Championship, Syuri announced that she had signed with Stardom. On November 14, Donna del Mondo lost the Artist of Stardom Championship to Oedo Tai (Bea Priestley, Natsuko Tora & Saki Kashima). On November 15, Syuri defeated Priestley to win the SWA World Championship but before the match Syuri would be eligible to wrestle for the title due to her Filipino heritage from her mother. On December 20, Syrui defended the title in a title vs. title match against Donna del Mondo's leader Giulia who defended the Wonder of Stardom Championship. The match ended in a time-limit draw, as both titleholders retained their titles in the process.

On January 5, 2021, on the second night of New Japan Pro-Wrestling (NJPW)'s Wrestle Kingdom 15, Syuri made her first NJPW appearance where she, alongside Giulia, defeated Iwatani & Tam Nakano in a dark match. On April 4, 2021, Syuri & Giulia defeated her fellow Donna del Mondo stablemates Himeka & Maika to win the Goddess of Stardom Championship for their first time. After that Syuri & Giulia would form a sub-team in their faction called Alto livello Kabaliwan with Alto livello meaning High level in Italian and Kabaliwan meaning Madness in Tagalog with names embracing both Syuri and Giulia's Filipino and Italian heritages. On September 25, Syuri won the 5★Star GP after defeating Momo Watanabe in the finals. On October 9, at Stardom 10th Anniversary Grand Final Osaka Dream Cinderella, Syuri defeated Saki Kashima to retain the SWA World Championship, originally it was supposed to be against Konami. However, due to an illness, her stablemate Saki Kashima competed in her place. After the match, she was challenged by AZM. On December 29, at Stardom Dream Queendom, Syuri defeated Utami Hayashishita to win the World of Stardom Championship. On January 29, 2022, at Stardom Nagoya Supreme Fight, Syuri made her first title defense as the World of Stardom Champion against her stablemate MIRAI. On March 26, at Stardom World Climax, Syuri made her second title defense of the World of Stardom Champion against her teammate and tag team partner Giulia. After the match, Syuri decided to leave Donna Del Mondo in order to create her own unit named God's Eye. Joining her would be ex-Actwres Girl'z wrestler Ami Sourei (renamed from Ami Miura) and ex-DDM member Mirai.

Shoot boxing and kickboxing career

On December 11, 2009, Kondo made her shoot boxing debut for the Jewels promotion at Jewels 6th Ring, defeating Asako Saioka via unanimous decision. At the end of the year, the promotion named her the Rookie of the Year. In her second match on February 13, 2010, Kondo picked up a majority decision victory over Fuka. On November 11, 2011, it was announced that Kondo would be making her kickboxing debut for the Krush promotion on January 9, 2012. On December 15, Miyako Mitsuhori was named Kondo's opponent at the event. Despite the handicap, Kondo would go on to win the match with a majority decision. On March 7, Krush announced that Kondo would return for her second fight in the promotion on April 22 at Krush-Ex 2012. On March 19, Yukari Sakamoto was named Kondo's opponent. Kondo ended up dominating the fight and winning a unanimous decision. On July 10, Syuri's third kickboxing match was announced as taking place on August 12 at Krush.21, where she would face Emiko Matsumoto. In the match, Kondo scored her first knockout win, defeating Matsumoto 66 seconds into the second round. On September 21, Krush announced that Kondo would return to the promotion on November 10 at Krush.24, where she would face Miku Hayashi. In the end, Kondo earned another unanimous decision victory to remain undefeated in her kickboxing career. On May 21, 2013, Krush announced Kondo's next match for June 2, when she would face Taiwanese fighter Chen Wei-ting. Syuri went on to win the fight via unanimous decision. Kondo's next fight took place at an event held by the J-Girls promotion as opposed to Krush, where she, on September 1, defeated Yayoi Sanchez with a unanimous decision.

On November 19, it was announced that Kondo would be returning to Krush on January 4, 2014, when she would enter a four-woman tournament to determine the first Krush Women's Champion. On January 4, Kondo defeated Yayoi Sanchez for the second time a row with a unanimous decision to advance to the finals of the tournament. In the finals of the tournament on March 16, Kondo faced Miku Hayashi in a rematch of their Krush.24 match. At the end of three rounds of fighting, one judge gave the match to Kondo with a score of 30–29, while the other two scored it 29–29, meaning that the match had to be decided in a fourth extra round. All three judges gave the extra round to Kondo with a score of 10–8, making her the inaugural Krush Women's Champion. On June 2, it was announced that Kondo would be making her first title defense on July 13 against Kanako Taniyama. Kondo won the match with another unanimous decision, making her first successful defense of the Krush Women's Championship. Kondo made her second successful title defense on December 21 with a unanimous decision win over Aki Gracyer. On January 17, 2015, it was announced that Kondo's next fight would be taking place in the K-1 promotion on February 1, when she would face Chinese fighter E Meidie in Changsha, China. The non-title match ended in Kondo's first defeat, losing via unanimous decision. On August 6, it was announced that Kondo would be making her third defense of the Krush Women's Championship against Tomoko SP on September 12. Kondo won the fight with a unanimous decision.

Mixed martial arts career

Pancrase (2016–2017) 
On January 30, 2016, it was announced that Kondo would be making her mixed martial arts debut for Pancrase on April 24. She had been training MMA since the previous December with Eiji Mitsuoka and Hideki Kadowaki. Her debut match opponent was later revealed as Kanna Asakura. Kondo won her MMA debut via unanimous decision. Kondo's second MMA fight took place on July 24, when she defeated Nicolle Angelica Caliari via unanimous decision. Kondo's third fight took place on November 13, when she defeated Sharma Devaiah via TKO due to punches in the first round. On February 5, 2017, Kondo defeated Minna Grusander via unanimous decision in the main event of Pancrase 284 to remain undefeated. On May 28 at Pancrase 287, Kondo defeated Kinberly Tanaka Novaes via unanimous decision to become the inaugural Strawweight Queen of Pancrase.

Ultimate Fighting Championship (2017–2021)
On July 13, 2017, it was reported that Kondo had been signed to make her Ultimate Fighting Championship (UFC) debut on September 23 at UFC Fight Night: Saint Preux vs. Okami, facing Chan-Mi Jeon. Kondo won the fight with a split decision. For her second fight, Kondo faced Poliana Botelho on May 19, 2018. at UFC Fight Night 129. She lost the fight via TKO due to a body kick and punches just 33 seconds into the first round. Kondo's third opponent was Yan Xiaonan, in a fight that took place on November 24, 2018, at UFC Fight Night 141. She lost the fight via unanimous decision. In her fourth fight, Kondo faced Ashley Yoder on June 22, 2019, at UFC on ESPN+ 12. She lost the fight via unanimous decision.

In February 2021, it was reported that Kondo and UFC had parted ways.

Other media
In 2011, Kondo began working with female idol group Apple Tale. The collaboration, named "Apple Tale with Syuri", released its debut album, on January 13, 2012. In 2013, Kondo released her first gravure DVD, titled Watashi. From June 20 to 22, 2014, Kondo was a part of stage acting group Mizuiro Kakumei, working three performances in Tokyo. In August 2015, Kondo released a photobook entitled Syuri.

Championships and accomplishments

Kickboxing and shoot boxing
Jewels
Rookie of the Year (2009)
Krush
Krush Women's Championship (1 time)
Krush Women's Championship Tournament (2014)

Mixed martial arts
Pancrase
Women's Strawweight Championship (1 time)

Professional wrestling
Oz Academy
Oz Academy Tag Team Championship (1 time) – with Hikaru Shida

Pro Wrestling Illustrated
Ranked No. 1 of the top 150 female singles wrestlers in the PWI Women's 150 in 2022
Ranked No. 7 of the top 150 female singles wrestlers in the PWI Women's 150 in 2021
Ranked No. 3 of the top 50 Tag Teams in the PWI Tag Team 50 in 2021 – 

Pro Wrestling Wave
Catch the Wave Best Bout Award (2012) vs. Ayumi Kurihara on June 24

Reina Joshi Puroresu
CMLL World Women's Championship (1 time)
CMLL-Reina International Championship (1 time)
ECCW Women's Championship (1 time)
Reina World Tag Team Championship (2 times) – with Hikaru Shida (1) and Silueta (1)
Reina World Women's Championship (1 time)

Sendai Girls' Pro Wrestling
Sendai Girls Tag Team Championship (1 time) – with Hikaru Shida

Smash
Smash Diva Championship (1 time)

Tokyo Sports
Women's Wrestling Grand Prize (2022)

World Wonder Ring Stardom
World of Stardom Championship (1 time)
Goddess of Stardom Championship (1 time) – with Giulia
Artist of Stardom Championship (1 time) – with Giulia and Maika
SWA World Championship (1 time)
5★Star GP (2021)
5★Star GP Award (2 time)
5★Star GP Best Match Award (2020) 
5★Star GP Blue Stars Best Match Award (2021) 
Stardom Year-End Award (3 times)
Best Match Award (2022) – 
Best Unit Award (2020) 
MVP Award (2022)

Wrestling New Classic
WNC Women's Championship (2 times)
WNC Women's Championship Tournament (2012)

Other titles
Queen of the Ring Championship (1 time, current)
 Wrestling Observer Newsletter
 Women's Wrestling MVP (2022)

Fight records

Mixed martial arts record

|Loss
|align=center|6–3
|Ashley Yoder
|Decision (unanimous)
|UFC Fight Night: Moicano vs. Korean Zombie 
|
|align=center|3
|align=center|5:00
|Greenville, South Carolina, United States
|
|-
|Loss
|align=center|6–2
|Yan Xiaonan
|Decision (unanimous)
|UFC Fight Night: Blaydes vs. Ngannou 2 
|
|align=center|3
|align=center|5:00
|Beijing, China
| 
|- 
|Loss
|align=center| 6–1
|Poliana Botelho
|TKO (body kicks and punches)
|UFC Fight Night: Maia vs. Usman
|
|align=center|1
|align=center|0:33
|Santiago, Chile
|
|-
| Win
| align=center| 6–0
| Chan-Mi Jeon
| Decision (split)
| UFC Fight Night: Saint Preux vs. Okami 
| 
| align=center| 3
| align=center| 5:00
| Saitama, Japan
|
|-
| Win
| align=center| 5–0
| Kinberly Tanaka Novaes
| Decision (unanimous)
| Pancrase 287
| 
| align=center| 5
| align=center| 5:00
| Tokyo, Japan
| 
|-
| Win
| align=center| 4–0
| Minna Grusander
| Decision (unanimous)
| Pancrase 284
| 
| align=center| 3
| align=center| 5:00
| Tokyo, Japan
| 
|-
| Win
| align=center| 3–0
| Sharma Devaiah
| TKO (punches)
| Pancrase 282
| 
| align=center| 1
| align=center| 3:38
| Tokyo, Japan
| 
|-
| Win
| align=center| 2–0
| Nicolle Caliari
| Decision (unanimous)
| Pancrase 279
| 
| align=center| 3
| align=center| 5:00
| Tokyo, Japan
| 
|-
| Win
| align=center| 1–0
| Kanna Asakura
| Decision (unanimous)
| Pancrase 277
| 
| align=center| 3
| align=center| 3:00
| Tokyo, Japan
|

Kickboxing record

Legend:

References

External links

Krush profile 
Pancrase profile 
Hustle profile 
 

1989 births
Japanese female dancers
Japanese female professional wrestlers
Japanese women pop singers
Japanese gravure idols
Japanese female kickboxers
Japanese female mixed martial artists
Mixed martial artists utilizing shootboxing
Mixed martial artists utilizing karate
Mixed martial artists utilizing wrestling
Japanese people of Filipino descent
Living people
People from Ebina, Kanagawa
Sportspeople from Kanagawa Prefecture
Japanese female karateka
21st-century Japanese singers
21st-century Japanese women singers
Ultimate Fighting Championship female fighters
21st-century professional wrestlers
CMLL World Women's Champions
Reina World Tag Team Champions
CMLL-Reina International Champions
World of Stardom Champions
SWA World Champions
Goddess of Stardom Champions
Artist of Stardom Champions